Khoroolol is the Mongolian equivalent for neighbourhood or, in densely built residential areas (quarter), for the Russian mikrorayon. In Ulaanbaatar, the apartment khoroolols built during socialist times carry numbers between one and nineteen, though some are named after higher numbers like 40,000 and 120,000.

References

Geography of Mongolia
Neighbourhoods